Auchinstarry is a village in North Lanarkshire, Scotland, UK, near to Kilsyth. It is the site of a Roman fort.

Auchinstarry Basin is on the Forth and Clyde Canal, and a £1.2M regeneration project has created a mooring basin for boats with 56 pontoon berths, a hard standing area for 40 boats, and a customer facilities block, partly funded by British Waterways Scotland. The basin was officially opened in September 2005.

The Environment Advisory Service (EAS), a government agency, has implemented a number of sustainability features at Auchinstarry Basin:
Deploying recycled materials in all parts of the construction process
An innovative pump which draws heat from the canal; it is believed that this is the first such use of canal water in the UK
Plans for installing wind turbines, and a new pub which is self-sufficient in its energy needs

See also
List of places in North Lanarkshire

References
Environment Advisory Service case Study on Auchinstarry Basin
It is also home to Auchinstarry Quarry which is a very popular rock-climbing destination, boasting a very wide range of climbing.

External links
Video footage of Auchinstarry Marina

Villages in North Lanarkshire